Vibart Johashen (born 17 August 1946) is a Guyanese cricketer. He played in one List A and nine first-class matches for Guyana from 1973 to 1979.

See also
 List of Guyanese representative cricketers

References

External links
 

1946 births
Living people
Guyanese cricketers
Guyana cricketers
Sportspeople from Georgetown, Guyana